Mietraching may refer to:

Deggendorf-Mietraching, Bavaria
Bad Aibling-Mietraching, Bavaria